Kashi Nilou Isfahan Futsal Club was an Iranian futsal club based in Isfahan.

History

2015-16 
Kashi Nilou terminated their sports activities due to financial problems in half season 2015-16.

Season-by-season 
The table below chronicles the achievements of the Club in various competitions.

References 

Futsal clubs in Iran
Sport in Isfahan
2015 disestablishments in Iran
Defunct futsal clubs in Iran